is a Japanese former voice actress who was previously represented by Gekidan Moonlight and by Atomic Monkey at the time of her retirement. She was born in Atami, Shizuoka. On August 30, 2018, she announced her retirement from voice acting, which she attributed to personal reasons.

Filmography

Anime
{| class="wikitable sortable"
! Year !! Name !! Japanese !! Role !! Notes !! Ref
|-
| 1989-1999 || Saber Marionette J to X || セイバーマリオネット J to X || Otaru Mamiya || ||
|-
| 1995 || Legend of the Angel of Love, Wedding Peach || 愛天使伝説ウェディングピーチ|| Scarlet O'Hara/Angel Salvia || ||
|-
| rowspan="3" | 1996 || Burn Up W || バーンナップW || Rio Kinezono || ||
|-
| Apocalypse Zero || 覚悟のススメ || Hiroko Uchiyama || Ep. 1 ||
|-
| Bakusō Kyōdai Let's & Go!! || 爆走兄弟レッツ&ゴー!! || Kai Okita || || 
|-
| rowspan="4" | 1997 || Burn Up Excess || バーンナップEXCESS || Rio Kinezono || ||
|-
| VS Knight Ramune & 40 Fire || ＶＳ騎士ラムネ＆４０炎 || Drum, Electone || ||
|-
| Maze || MAZE☆爆熱時空 || Ranchiki || ||
|-
| El Hazard 2: The Magnificent World || 神秘の世界エルハザード || (Kalia || ||
|-
| rowspan="3" | 1999 || Crest of the Stars || 星界の紋章 || Jinto || ||
|-
| Revolutionary Girl Utena || 少女革命ウテナ || Wakaba Shinohara || ||
|-
| Magical DoReMi || おジャ魔女どれみ || Miss Yuki/Queen of the Witch World || ||
|-
| 1999-2001 || 'Excel Saga || エクセル♥サーガ || Misaki Matsuya || ||
|-
| rowspan="4" | 2000 || Boys Be... || ボーイズ・ビー || Shoko Sayama || Eps. 8, 13 ||
|-
| Mon Colle Knights || 六門天外モンコレナイト || Guko || ||
|-
| Now and Then, Here and There || 今、そこに いる僕 || Nabuca || ||
|-
| One Piece || ONE PIECE || Tobio || ||
|-
| rowspan="3" | 2001 || Fruits Basket || フルーツバスケット || Arisa Uotani, young Akito Sohma || ||
|-
| Final Fantasy: Unlimited || ファイナルファンタジー:アンリミテッド || Yu Hayakawa || ||
|-
| Puni Puni Poemy || ぷにぷに☆ぽえみぃ || Futaba Aasu || || 
|-
| 2001-2002 || Digimon Tamers || デジモンテイマーズ || Renamon, Alice McCoy, Hata Seiko, Makino Rumiko || ||
|-
| 2003 || Peacemaker Kurogane || PEACE MAKER鐵 || Suzu Kitamura || ||
|-
| 2003-2004 || Di Gi Charat Nyo! || デ・ジ・キャラットにょ || Look-Alike of Akari Usada || ||
|-
| 2003-2006 || Zatch Bell! || 金色のガッシュ!! || Lori || ||
|-
| rowspan="2" | 2005 || Mushishi || 蟲師 || Nagi || Ep. 6 ||
|-
| Banner of the Stars || 星界の戦旗 || Jinto || ||
|-
| 2006 || Oh My Goddess! || ああっ女神さまっ || Chihiro Fujimi || ||
|-
| 2006-2007 || Futari wa Pretty Cure Splash Star || ふたりはプリキュア Splash Star || Kaoru Kiryuu || ||
|-
| 2008-2010 || Duel Masters || ゼロ デュエル・マスターズ || Rekuta Kadoko || ||
|-
| rowspan="2" | 2009-2010 || Fresh Pretty Cure! || フレッシュプリキュア! || Queen of the Mekurumeku Kingdom || ||
|-
| Suite PreCure || スイートプリキュア♪ || Misori Minamino || ||
|-
| 2011 || Uta no Prince-sama Maji Love 1000% || うたの☆プリンスさまっ♪ マジLOVE1000％ || Tomochika Shibuya || Season 1 || 
|-
| 2011-2012 || Smile PreCure! || スマイルプリキュア！ || Forest of Girl || ||
|-
| 2012-2013 || Doki Doki! PreCure || ドキドキ！プリキュア || Ai/Princess Marie Ange || ||
|-
| 2013 || Uta no Prince-sama Maji Love 2000% || うたの☆プリンスさまっ♪マジLOVE2000％ || Tomochika Shibuyaa || 1 ep. ||
|-
| 2015 || Uta no Prince-sama Maji Love Revolutions || うたの☆プリンスさまっ♪マジLOVEレボリューションズ || Tomochika Shibuya || ||
|-
| 2017 || Ojarumaru || おじゃる丸 || Hoshiemon Hiraki (Young); Mariko Juumonji; Nozomi; Otome-sensei (Season 3+); Sayuri Tamura (Young); Warashi; Yuri Tanabe || ||
|}

Video games
 1997: Kurumi Miracle as Kurumi
 1997: Tales of Destiny as Rutee Katrea
 1999: Galerians as Rita
 2002: Mega Man Zero as Fairy Leviathan
 2004: Shadow Hearts: Covenant as Princess Anastasia Romanov
 2004: Growlanser II: The Sense of Justice as Wein Cruz
 2005: Namco × Capcom as Rutee Katrea, Lilith Aensland
 2006: Final Fantasy XII as Larsa Ferrinas Solidor
 2006: Mega Man ZX as Chihiro Fujimi
 2009: Kazoku Keikaku'' as Jun Ogawara, Kei Hisami (credited as Junko Sugisawa)

Other
Final Fantasy Tactics Advance radio edition (Marche Radiuju)

References

External links
Official blog 
Official agency profile 
Yuka Imai at GamePlaza-Haruka Voice Acting Database 
Yuka Imai at Hitoshi Doi's Seiyuu Database

1970 births
Living people
Voice actresses from Shizuoka Prefecture
Japanese video game actresses
Japanese voice actresses
20th-century Japanese actresses
21st-century Japanese actresses